The 42nd Annual GMA Dove Awards presentation was held on April 20, 2011, at the Fox Theatre in Atlanta, Georgia. The show was broadcast on GMC on April 24, 2011, hosted by Sherri Shepherd from The Newlywed Game.

Nominations were announced on February 15, 2011. The awards recognized the accomplishments of Christian musicians for the year 2010.

Performers

Telecast ceremony
The following performed:

Presenters

The following presented:
Francesca Battistelli
Sandi Patty – Female Vocalist of the Year
Chonda Pierce
Marvin Sapp
Committed
Ernie Haase and Signature Sound
Lecrae
Audrey Assad
Deitrick Haddon
Smokie Norful
Tim Tebow
Greg Jennings
Ruben Studdard
Kim Fields

Awards

General
Artist of the Year
Francesca Battistelli
Jason Crabb
Natalie Grant
Ernie Haase & Signature Sound
Marvin Sapp
TobyMac
Chris Tomlin
Jonny Dent
New Artist of the Year
Audrey Assad
Chris August
Forever Jones
John Mark McMillan
No Other Name
Kerrie Roberts
Kristian Stanfill

Group of the Year
Ernie Haase & Signature Sound
Gaither Vocal Band
MercyMe
Mikeschair
Needtobreathe
Sidewalk Prophets
Tenth Avenue North

Male Vocalist of the Year
Doug Anderson
Chris August
Jason Crabb
Brandon Heath
Israel Houghton
Marvin Sapp
Chris Tomlin

Female Vocalist of the Year
Audrey Assad
Francesca Battistelli
Natalie Grant
Britt Nicole
Janet Paschal
Kerrie Roberts
Laura Story

Song of the Year
"All of Creation" – MercyMe
Bart Millard, Robby Shaffer, Jim Bryson, Mike Scheuchzer, Barry Graul, songwriters
"Beautiful, Beautiful" – Francesca Battistelli
Francesca Battistelli, Ian Eskelin, Andrew Fromm, songwriters
"Get Back Up" – TobyMac
Toby McKeehan, Cary Barlowe, Jamie Moore, Aaron Rice, songwriters
"Hold My Heart" – Tenth Avenue North
Mike Donehey, Jason Ingram, Phillip LaRue, songwriters
"Lead Me" – Sanctus Real
Matt Hammitt, Jason Ingram, Chris Rohman, songwriters
"Let the Waters Rise" – Mikeschair
Sam Tinnesz, Mike Grayson, Ben Glover, songwriters
"Love Came Calling" – Triumphant Quartet
Wayne Haun, Joel Lindsey, songwriters
"Our God" – Chris Tomlin
Jonas Myrin, Matt Redman, Jesse Reeves, Chris Tomlin, songwriters
"Sometimes I Cry" – Jason Crabb
Gerald Crabb, songwriter
"Starry Night" – Chris August
Chris August, Ed Cash, songwriters

Songwriter of the Year
Gerald Crabb

Producer of the Year
Ed Cash
Ian Eskelin
Wayne Haun
Bernie Herms
Jason Ingram and Rusty Varenkamp

Pop
Pop/Contemporary Recorded Song of the Year
"All of Creation" – MercyMe
"Beautiful, Beautiful" – Francesca Battistelli
"Get Back Up" – TobyMac
"Keep Changing the World" – Mikeschair
"Lead Me" – Sanctus Real
"Starry Night" – Chris August

Pop/Contemporary Album of the Year
Jars of Clay Presents: The Shelter – Jars of Clay
Love Revolution – Natalie Grant
No Far Away – Chris August
The Light Meets the Dark – Tenth Avenue North
Until the Whole World Hears – Casting Crowns

Rock
Rock Recorded Song of the Year
"Anchor" – Satellites and Sirens
"Dear X (You Don’t Own Me)" – Disciple
"Showstopper" – TobyMac
"Start Again" – Red
"The Sound (John M. Perkins' Blues)" – Switchfoot

Rock/Contemporary Recorded Song of the Year
"Beautiful Things" – Gungor
"Lift Up Your Face" – Third Day
"Something Beautiful" – Needtobreathe
"Straight to Your Heart" – Mikeschair
"Tonight" – TobyMac

Rock Album of the Year
Horseshoes & Handgrenades – Disciple
Live – DecembeRadio
Memento Mori – Flyleaf
The World Is a Thorn – Demon Hunter
Travel III – Future of Forestry

Rock/Contemporary Album of the Year
Move – Third Day
Pieces of a Real Heart – Sanctus Real
Satellites & Sirens – Satellites & Sirens
The Medicine – John Mark McMillan
The Rising – Charlie Hall
Tonight – TobyMac

Rap/Hip-Hop
Rap/Hip-Hop Recorded Song of the Year
"Background" – Lecrae
"Calling You" – KJ-52
"No Be Nah" – John Reuben
"Too Many Fakes" – JayEss
"Walking On the Stars" – Group 1 Crew

Rap/Hip–Hop Album of the Year
Between Two Worlds – Trip Lee
Outta Space Love – Group 1 Crew
Rapture Ruckus – Rapture Ruckus
Rehab – Lecrae
Sex, Drugs and Self-Control – John Reuben

Inspirational
Inspirational Recorded Song of the Year
"Christ Is Risen" – Matt Maher
"Great Are You Lord" – Phillips, Craig & Dean
"I Feel a Song Coming On" – Ryan Seaton
"Joseph" – Jason Crabb
"You Deliver Me" – Selah
"polly put kettle on" - Jonny Dent

Inspirational Album of the Year
A capella – Brian Free & Assurance
Acoustic Sunday – Kevin Williams
Downtown Church – Patty Griffin
The Edge of the Divine – Sandi Patty
The Stage Is Bare – Ryan Seaton

Gospel
Southern Gospel Recorded Song of the Year
"Better Day" – Gaither Vocal Band
"Faithful One" – The Booth Brothers
"I Thirst" – Ernie Haase & Signature Sound
"Live With Jesus" – The Oak Ridge Boys
"Love Came Calling" – Triumphant Quartet

Southern Gospel Album of the Year
A Tribute to the Cathedral Quartet – Ernie Haase & Signature Sound
Greatly Blessed – Gaither Vocal Band
Never Walk Alone – Brian Free & Assurance
Shine – Bowling Family
Something's Happening – The Hoppers

Traditional Gospel Recorded Song of the Year
"Go Tell It on the Mountain" – Jason Crabb
"Jesus Has Been This Way Before" – Beverly Moore
"TheFavor" – Shirley Caesar
" Greatest Name" – Victory Cathedral Choir
"The Master Plan" – Tamela Mann

Traditional Gospel Album of the Year
A City Called Heaven – Shirley Caesar
At the Revival – Mighty Clouds Of Joy
Smokie Norful Presents – Victory Cathedral Choir
The Master Plan – Tamela Mann
Waymaker – The Original Messengers

Contemporary Gospel Recorded Song of the Year
"He Wants It All" – Forever Jones
"I Choose to Worship" – Wess Morgan
"Nobody Greater" – VaShawn Mitchell, Darius Paulk
"The Best In Me" – Marvin Sapp
"You Hold My World" – Israel Houghton

Contemporary Gospel Album of the Year
Get Ready – Forever Jones
Gospel According to Jazz 3 – Kirk Whalum
Here I Am – Marvin Sapp
Love God, Love People – Israel Houghton
Triumphant – VaShawn Mitchell

Country & Bluegrass
Country Recorded Song of the Year
"Are You the One" – Guy Penrod
"God's Gonna Ease My Troublin’ Mind" – The Oak Ridge Boys
"Living In the Arms Of Mercy" – The Hoppers
"Run and Tell" – Bowling Family
"There Is Nothing Greater Than Grace" – Point of Grace

Country Album of the Year
Breathe Deep – Guy Penrod
Expecting Good Things – Jeff & Sheri Easter
Mosaic – Ricky Skaggs
No Changin' Us – Point of Grace
Times Like These – Austins Bridge
Turn Up the Music – Crawford Crossing

Bluegrass Recorded Song of the Year
"Blaze of Glory" – Chigger Hill Boys & Terri
"I’m Going to Make Heaven My Home" – Lewis Tradition
"I’m Using My Bible for a Roadmap" – George Hamilton IV with Del McCoury & The Moody Brothers
"Mountaintop" – Lizzy Long & Little Roy Lewis
"Standing" – Cherryholmes
"Workin’ on a Road" – Jeff & Sheri Easter

Bluegrass Album of the Year
...Oh Well – Chigger Hill Boys & Terri
Just a Little Closer Home – Paul Williams & The Victory Trio
Light On My Feet, Ready To Fly – Doyle Lawson & Quicksilver
Look to the Light: Songs of Faith from the Pen of Rick Lang – Various Artists
Singing From the Heart – Dailey & Vincent
Sounds Like Heaven to Me – Lou Reid & Carolina

Praise & Worship
Worship Song of the Year
"Christ Is Risen" – Matt Maher
Matt Maher, Mia Fieldes, songwriters
"The Greatness of Our God" – Hillsong Live
Reuben Morgan, Jason Ingram, Stuart Garrard, songwriters
"How Great Is the Love" – Meredith Andrews
Meredith Andrews, Jacob Sooter, Paul Baloche, songwriters
"How He Loves" – John Mark McMillan 
John Mark McMillan, songwriter
"Our God" – Chris Tomlin
Jonas Myrin, Matt Redman, Jesse Reeves, Chris Tomlin, songwriters

Praise & Worship Album of the Year
A Beautiful Exchange – Hillsong Live
As Long As It Takes – Meredith Andrews
Everywhere – Geron Davis
Jars of Clay Presents: The Shelter – Jars of Clay
Passion: Awakening – Chris Tomlin, Kristian Stanfill, David Crowder Band, Christy Nockels, Charlie Hall, Matt Redman, Fee, Hillsong United
We Cry Out: The Worship Project – Jeremy Camp

Others
Urban Recorded Song of the Year
"All I Need" – Brian Courtney Wilson
"Finally" – Lowell Pye
"He Knows" – Karen Clark Sheard
"Life" – Beckah Shae
"Wait On the Lord" – Lola Godheld

Spanish Language Album of the Year
Altisima Adoracion – V Music
Con Todo – Hillsong
Cuan Gran Amor – En Vivo Miami – Ingrid Rosario
Devoción – Danilo Montero
Mi Declaracion – Hector Sotelo

Special Event Album of the Year
One Voice – Every Tribe, Tongue & Nation (Survivor Records/EMI Gospel)
Passion: Awakening (Sparrow Records/Sixsteps Records)
Rock of Ages (BEC Recordings)
Sweetpea's Songs for Girls (Big Idea)
The British Are Coming (Zoë Records)

Christmas Album of the Year
Another Sentimental Christmas – Russ Taff
Christmas Like This – Ayiesha Woods
Home for the Holidays – Point of Grace
The Essential Christmas Collection – Various artists
The Isaacs Christmas – The Isaacs

Choral Collection of the Year
All I Need – Geron Davis and Bradley Knight
Big Mighty God – Lari Goss and Russell Mauldin
Declare Your Name – Carol Cymbala (orchestrated by Chris MacDonald)
National Quartet Convention Collection – Marty Hamby
Rise and Sign (featuring the Prestonwood Student C) – Bradley Knight

Recorded Music Packaging of the Year
Fireflies and Songs – Sara Groves
Wayne Brezinka (art director, graphic artist), Jaime Rau (illustrator/photographer); INO Records
Hello Hurricane (Deluxe Edition) – Switchfoot
Rob Gold (art director), Andy Barron (graphic artist, illustrator/photographer); Lowercase people records/Atlantic Records
Move – Third Day
Beth Lee (art director), Tim Parker (graphic artist, illustrator/photographer); Essential Records
Suburba – House of Heroes
Brad Moist (art director), Eddy Boer (graphic artist), Andrew Beckman (illustrator/photographer); Gotee Records
The World Is a Thorn (Deluxe Edition) – Demon Hunter
Ryan Clark (art director), Dan Seagrave (graphic artist), Jerad Knudson (illustrator/photographer); Solid State Records
We Cry Out: The Worship Project (Deluxe Edition) – Jeremy Camp
Jordan Butcher (art director, graphic artist), Laura Dart (illustrator/photographer); BEC Recordings

Musicals
Musical of the Year
"What's Up, Zak?" A Musical Encounter with Jesus
As Sure As My Redeemer Lives... So Shall I
God Coming Down
Just Run
The Star Still Shines

Videos
Short Form Music Video of the Year
"Better Than a Hallelujah" – Amy Grant
Kip Kubin (video director and producer)
"For Those Who Wait" – Fireflight
Andy & Jon Erwin (video directors), Dan Atchison (video producer)
"Invasion (Hero)" – Trip Lee
Amisho Baraka Lewis (video director), TK McKamy (video producer)
"My Own Little World" – Matthew West
Eric Welch (video director and producer)
"SMS (Shine)" – David Crowder Band
David Crowder Band (video directors and producers)

Long Form Music Video of the Year
A Beautiful Exchange – Hillsong Live
Joel Houston (video director), Joel Houston, Andrew Crawford, Reuben Morgan (video producers)
A Tribute to the Cathedral Quartet – Ernie Haase & Signature Sound
Doug Stuckey (video director), Bill Gaither, Ernie Haase (video producers)
An Inconvenient Christmas – The Oak Ridge Boys
Jim Halsey (video director), Warren G. Stitt, David Forman, Duane Allen (video producers)
Count Your Blessings – Bill and Gloria Gaither and Homecoming Friends
Doug Stuckey (video director), Bill Gaither, Barry Jennings, Bill Carter (video producers)
Until the Whole World Hears... Live – Casting Crowns
Andy & Jon Erwin (video directors), Dan Atchison (video producer)

Artists with multiple nominations and awards 

The following artists received multiple nominations:
 Six: TobyMac
 Five: Ernie Haase & Signature Sound
 Four: Francesca Battistelli, Jason Crabb, Marvin Sapp, Chris Tomlin
 Three: Natalie Grant

The following artists received multiple awards:
 Three: Francesca Battistelli, Chris August, Jason Crabb, Point of Grace
 Two: Needtobreathe, Group 1 Crew, Gaither Vocal Band, Meredith Andrews

References

External links
Dove Awards Official Website
GMA renews contract with gmc
42nd GMA Dove Awards nominees
Batistelli, August Win Big at 42nd Dove Awards

2011 music awards
GMA Dove Awards
GMA Dove
2011 in American music
GMA